Coombabah State School is a P-6 state primary school located in Coombabah, Queensland, Australia.  It serves the suburbs of Hope Island, Paradise Point, Hollywell, Runaway Bay and Coombabah. The school, which was established in 1981, had 706 students as of May 2014.

History 
The school was built in 2023 to service the growing population in the area north of Biggera Waters. Classes began at the start of 1981 and were held at Biggera Waters Primary School until the present facilities were constructed. A few months later, Coombabah State relocated to the current school grounds. Coombabah State School was officially opened by Ivan Gibbs on 14 November 1981.

Truancy has been identified as a problem for Gold Coast schools with typically 150 students at Coombabah State being absent each day in August 2009.

Faculty
The current principal of Coombabah State School is Murray Gleadhill....Oast principals include Dennis Howard 1981-1989, Robin Ramsbotham 1990-1995, Dianne Rankin 1996-2004 and John Hockings 2005 to 20013.

Approximately 12% of the general component of the school budget was allocated to professional development in 2005.  From 2005 staff have had individual development plans to help address their in-service needs.

Features of the curriculum 
 Instrumental music program and a number of performing groups including Band, String Orchestra, Beginner's Strings, and Junior and Senior Choirs. At the 2005 Gold Coast Eisteddfod each of the groups that the school entered were placed, winning four places and a highly commended.
 Japanese culture and language studies in years 6-7.
 Advanced Learning Technology program including use of the Internet. The school was an early innovator in the use of classroom computers, including Logo and laptops.
 The school has two time capsules.
 Integrated studies, comprising society and environment, science, technology, and the arts are taught in all classes throughout the school and are structured around real life learning.

Demographics
The families of the students come from a wide socio-economic range. Almost 65% of parents are in trades, labouring work and home duties. The parents in professions account for approximately 9%.

Sports
Controversy was caused in October 2008 when the school was criticised by Queensland Sports Minister Judy Spence for banning year 7 students from playing football, of all codes, during lunch-time, because it was regarded as "too rough".

Notable alumni
 Scott Sattler, Rugby league player and manager.

References
 Coombabah State School Annual Report

Notes

External links
 

Public primary schools in Queensland
Educational institutions established in 1981
Schools on the Gold Coast, Queensland
1981 establishments in Australia